Evodianthus is a genus of plants first described as a genus in 1857. It contains only one known species, Evodianthus funifer , native to Trinidad & Tobago, Central America (Costa Rica, Panama, Nicaragua) and northern South America (N Brazil, the Guianas, Venezuela, Colombia, Ecuador, Peru).

Subspecies
 Evodianthus funifer subsp. fendlerianus Harding - Aragua State in Venezuela
 Evodianthus funifer subsp. funifer - most of species range
 Evodianthus funifer subsp. peruvianus Harling - Colombia, Ecuador, Peru
 Evodianthus funifer subsp. trailianus (Drude) Harling - Guianas, Colombia, Peru, NW Brazil

References

Cyclanthaceae
Monotypic Pandanales genera
Flora of South America
Flora of Central America
Flora of Trinidad and Tobago